Bernt Sigurd Torberntsson (20 April 1929 – 30 May 2017) was a Swedish rower. Together with Evert Gunnarsson he won the 1949 European Championships in the coxless pair, but had no success at the 1948 and 1952 Olympics.

References

1929 births
2017 deaths
Swedish male rowers
Olympic rowers of Sweden
Rowers at the 1948 Summer Olympics
Rowers at the 1952 Summer Olympics
European Rowing Championships medalists
People from Kungälv Municipality
Sportspeople from Västra Götaland County